Meissner, Meißner or Meisner may refer to:

Geography
Meissner is the name of the following geographic features:
 the Meißner (range), an important mountain range in Hesse, Germany
 Hoher Meißner, the highest peak of the Meißner range
 Meißner, Hesse, a community in the district Werra-Meißner-Kreis, in Hesse, Germany

Surnames
Meissner is a German surname. Notable people with the surname and its variants include:
 Alexander Meissner (1883–1958), Austrian engineer and physicist
 Andy Meisner (born 1973), American politician
 August Gottlieb Meißner (1753–1807), German writer
 Boris Meissner (1915–2003), German lawyer and social scientist
 Bruno Meissner (1868–1947), German assyriologist
 Carl Meissner (1800–1874), Swiss botanist
 Meisner's Banksia, Australian shrub
 Carl Meissner (1830–1900), German Latin scholar
 Constantin Meissner (1854-1942), Romanian teacher
 Elena Meissner (1867-1940), Romanian feminist
Elinor Meissner Traeger (1906-1983), composer
 Ernst Meisner (born 1982), Dutch dancer and choreographer
 Friedrich Ludwig Meissner (1796–1860), German obstetrician
 Fred Meissner (1931–2007), American geologist and engineer
 Freda Meissner-Blau (born 1927), Austrian politician and activist
 Georg Meissner (1829–1905), German anatomist and physiologist
 Meissner's corpuscle, type of mechanoreceptor
 Meissner's plexus, intestinal nerve plexus
 Greg Meisner (born 1959), American football player
 Günter Meisner (1926–1994), German actor
 Hans-Otto Meissner (1909–1992), German writer and novelist
 Heike Meißner, (born 1970), German hurdler and runner
 Heinrich August Meissner (1862–1940), German railway engineer and Ottoman Pasha
 James Meissner (1896–1936), American World War I flying ace
 Janusz Meissner (1901–1978), Polish writer and aviator
 Joachim Meisner (1933-2017), Cardinal and archbishop of Cologne, Germany
 Jochen Meißner (born 1943), German rower
 Johann Heinrich Meissner (1701-1770), German sculptor and wood carver
 Joern Meissner (born 1970), German academic and business consultant
 Karl Meissner (1891–1959), German-American physicist
 Katrin Meissner (born 1973), German swimmer
 Kimmie Meissner (born 1989), American figure skater
 Krzysztof Antoni Meissner (born 1961), Polish theoretical physicist
 Maurice Meisner (1931–2012), American historian of 20th century China
 Otto Meissner (1880–1953), head of the Office of the Reich President, Germany
 Paul Traugott Meissner (1778–1864), Austrian chemist
 Randy Meisner (born 1946), founder of the band the Eagles and solo artist
 Randy Meisner (1978 album), self-titled
 Randy Meisner (1982 album), self-titled
 Renate Meissner (born 1950), German sprinter and triple Olympic champion
 Sanford Meisner (1905–1997), American actor and acting coach
 Meisner technique, an acting technique
 Silvio Meißner (born 1973), German football player
 Stan Meissner (born 1956), Canadian songwriter/composer
 Stefan Meissner (born 1973), German football player
 Stuart Meissner (born 1962), American federal prosecutor and politician
 Verne Meisner (1938–2005), American polka musician
 Walther Meissner (1882–1974), German technical physicist
 Meissner effect, decay of a magnetic field inside a superconductor
 Wolf Meissner (born 1969), German wheelchair curler, 2018 Winter Paralympian

See also
 Messner

References

German-language surnames
German toponymic surnames